Black Rock is a novel by Steve Harris published by Victor Gollancz in 1996.

Plot summary
Black Rock features a haunted house near Tintagel on the north coast of Cornwall.

Reception
Jonathan Palmer reviewed Black Rock for Arcane magazine, rating it a 7 out of 10 overall. Palmer comments that "Black Rock is not a masterpiece; the characters flatten out as the plot develops and I lost interest in their fate; but it is a good book. When Steve Harris masters combining good plots with convincing characterisation, he'll write some better books. He just hasn't quite perfected his craft yet."

Reviews
Review by Sebastian Phillips (1996) in Vector 190

References

1996 novels